Daria Olegovna Vdovina (born 15 December 1989) is a Russian sports shooter. She competed in the Women's 10 metre air rifle event at the 2012 Summer Olympics.

References

External links
 

1989 births
Living people
Russian female sport shooters
Olympic shooters of Russia
Shooters at the 2012 Summer Olympics
Shooters at the 2016 Summer Olympics
Sportspeople from Izhevsk
Shooters at the 2015 European Games
European Games bronze medalists for Russia
European Games medalists in shooting
Universiade medalists in shooting
Universiade gold medalists for Russia
Universiade silver medalists for Russia
Medalists at the 2013 Summer Universiade
21st-century Russian women